Okilly Dokilly were an American heavy metal band from Phoenix, Arizona, United States, that played "Nedal" music; a subgenre of metal music themed around the animated character Ned Flanders from the television series The Simpsons. All four of the band's members performed dressed as Flanders, and the majority of the lyrics to their songs are quotes of his.

The band members go by the pseudonyms: Head Ned, Shred Ned, Zed Ned, Dread Ned and Bed Ned. The unusual concept behind the group has resulted in worldwide attention. The lead singer, Head Ned, said that Nedal music is "Not as fast as Bartcore, and a little cleaner than Krusty Punk”, references to hardcore punk and crust punk, respectively.

As of June 3, 2019, the band has acquired over 66,000 likes on Facebook. The band's first studio album, Howdilly Doodilly, was released on November 11, 2016. They announced their first nationwide tour via YouTube on February 5, 2017. On March 3, the band announced on instagram that Stead Ned and Thread Ned would be replaced on the upcoming tour by Dead Ned and Cred Ned on lead guitar and bass, respectively.

On July 31, 2018, the band announced that Bled Ned, Red Ned, Cred Ned and Dead Ned left the band and will be replaced by Shred Ned (guitars), Dread Ned (drums) and Zed Ned (synth) with the only remaining original Member being Head Ned. The band also announced in the same news that they are working on their second studio album, titled Howdilly Twodilly, which was released on March 29, 2019. In October 2018, Okilly Dokilly introduced Bed Ned as their new bassist.

On April 7, 2019, the band appeared during the end credits of The Simpsons episode "I'm Just a Girl Who Can't Say D'oh". After the release of their second album, Okilly Dokilly spent the remainder of the year touring the United States and Europe. In early 2020, they released the single "Slaughterhouse" and toured in Australia, but the COVID-19 pandemic made further touring impossible. The When the Comet Gets Here Tour that was planned for April and May 2020 had to be postponed twice, at first to 2021 and then to 2022. On November 2, 2021, the band announced that the tour was renamed to Tourdilly Do '22 and that it would be the last tour before an indefinite hiatus. In March 2022, a trailer for the tour announced two new supporting members, with Led Ned replacing Shred Ned on lead guitar and Bloodshed Ned taking the place of Bred Ned on bass.

The tour, and along with it the band's activities, ended on May 7, 2022 in Austin, Texas. In their seven years of existence, Okilly Dokilly performed a total of 239 shows all across the world. In August that year, they announced an additional farewell show for October 29, 2022. They also called for all fans to come dressed as Ned Flanders or other Simpsons characters, in an attempt to break the current world record of Most People Dressed Like Characters from The Simpsons in One Place.

Discography

LPs

Demos

Singles

Music videos

Members 
Current

 Head Ned – lead vocals, guitar, bass, mandolin, percussion 
 Zed Ned – keyboards 
 Dread Ned – drums 

Past
 Red Ned – keyboards, backing vocals 
 Stead Ned – lead guitar 
 Shred Ned – lead guitar 
 Thread Ned – bass 
 Bed Ned - bass 
 Bled Ned – drums 

Touring Members
 Dead Ned – lead guitar 
 Led Ned – lead guitar 
 Cred Ned – bass 
 Bred Ned – bass 
 Bloodshed Ned – bass 

Timeline

References

External links 

 

The Simpsons
Musical quintets
Heavy metal musical groups from Arizona
Comedy rock musical groups
Musical groups established in 2015
Musical groups disestablished in 2022
Bands with fictional stage personas
2015 establishments in Arizona
2022 disestablishments in Arizona
Musical groups from Phoenix, Arizona